Lithuanian Bobsleigh and Skeleton Federation is a national governing body of bobsleigh and skeleton sports in Lithuania.

History 
Lithuanian Bobsleigh and Skeleton Federation was founded in December 2013 at Vilnius, Lithuania.

Federation become a member of International Bobsleigh and Skeleton Federation.

References 

Luge
2013 establishments in Lithuania
Sports organizations established in 2013
Bobsleigh governing bodies
Skeleton governing bodies
Bobsleigh in Lithuania
Skeleton in Lithuania